Pyrgus sibirica is a diurnal species of Lepidoptera found in tundra environments. It was first described by naturalist Jaques-Louis Reverdin in 1911.

References

Butterflies described in 1911
sibirica